Ioana Olteanu (later Călin, born 25 February 1966) is a retired Romanian rower. Competing in eights she won two gold and one silver medals at the 1992–2000 Olympics and four world titles in 1993 and 1997–1999.

Olteanu retired after the 2000 Olympics and gave birth to a child in August 2004, aged 38.

References

1966 births
Living people
Romanian female rowers
Rowers at the 1992 Summer Olympics
Rowers at the 1996 Summer Olympics
Rowers at the 2000 Summer Olympics
Olympic rowers of Romania
Olympic gold medalists for Romania
Olympic silver medalists for Romania
Place of birth missing (living people)
Olympic medalists in rowing
Medalists at the 2000 Summer Olympics
Medalists at the 1996 Summer Olympics
Medalists at the 1992 Summer Olympics
World Rowing Championships medalists for Romania